Losing All Hope Is Freedom is the debut album released by the melodic hardcore band Evergreen Terrace.  The title is drawn from the novel Fight Club by Chuck Palahniuk.

Track listing
All music and lyrics by Evergreen Terrace, except where noted.

Personnel
Andrew Carey – lead vocals
Craig Chaney – lead guitar, clean vocals
Josh James – rhythm guitar, backing vocals
Jason Southwell – bass guitar
Christopher Brown – drums
Dave Quiggle – Artwork

Cultural references
The band is known for referring to pop culture in their titles, lyrics, and soundbites.

References

Evergreen Terrace albums
2001 debut albums
Indianola Records albums